Scrubb is a Thai musical duo composed of Thawatpon Wongboonsiri and Torpong Chantabubpha. The band has been known for their popular hits such as ทุกอย่าง (Everything) (2003), ใกล้ (Close) (2005), คู่กัน (Together) (2005), เข้ากันดี (Click) (2007) and รอยยิ้ม (Smile) (2013).

History 
Scrubb was formed by Silpakorn University students namely Thawatpon Wongboonsiri (Muey), a freshman from Nakhon Pathom and Torpong Chantabubpha (Ball), a senior from Bangkok. Both music lovers and studying in the Faculty of Education, they used to be members of the university's International Music Group. Thawatpon is the lead singer and works with the lyrics while Torpong on the rhythmic part.

As they graduated from university, they produced their own music and sold it to different record shops, promoted on websites and sent their demos to different record labels in Thailand. When their music reached Yutthana Boonaom (Ted), a director at Fat Radio, it was played on air and they eventually got an opportunity to perform for free at the Fat Festival. They went on and signed up with Black Sheep Records where they released their first album SSS..S..S in 2003.

The band later signed up with BEC-TERO in 2011 but did not renew their contract when it expired last 2019.

Discography

Studio albums

EP

Compilation albums

Singles

Main artist

Guest artist

Awards and nominations 
The band has received the following awards:
 Best New Artist – Fat Awards 2003
 Best Indie Album (Scrubb) – Hamburger Awards 2003
 Duo Artist of the Year – Seed Awards 2008
 Duo or Group Artist of the Year – Fat Awards 2010
 Album of the Year (Kid) – Fat Awards 2010

References

External links 
 
 
 

Thai musical duos
Musical groups from Bangkok
Thai pop music groups